Levee or levée comes from the French verb lever, meaning "getting up" or "rising". It has two main meanings:
 Levée (ceremony), formal ceremonial "risings" of a monarch from his bed each morning to meet with privileged people in relative privacy, which evolved into several different forms of state ceremonies in various countries
 Levee, a "rising" on a river bank, either one formed naturally by the periodic flooding of rivers or a man-made barrier created to control floods

Events
 Levée en masse, a forced, mass conscription to raise a military force
 New Year's levee a social event hosted by various Canadian dignitaries and institutions on New Year's Day

Places
 Levee Township, Pike County, Illinois
 The Levee, former red-light district in Chicago, Illinois

People
 John Levee (1924–2017), American abstract artist
 M. C. Levee (1891–1972), American film executive

Other uses
 Levee (horse), a Kentucky thoroughbred racehorse
 Levee Blues (1972), the second album from the American band Potliquor

See also
 Levy (disambiguation)